Rasteh Kenar (also Romanized as Rāsteh Kenār; also known as Rāsteh Kenār-e Pasīkhān) is a village in Molla Sara Rural District, in the Central District of Shaft County, Gilan Province, Iran. At the 2006 census, its population was 495, in 133 families.

References 

Populated places in Shaft County